Roma Tearne (née Chrysostom; born 1954) is a Sri Lankan-born artist and writer living and working in England. Her debut novel, Mosquito, was shortlisted for the 2007 Costa Book Awards first Novel prize (formerly the Whitbread Prize).

Early life and education
Tearne moved to South London in 1964 with her Sinhalese mother and Tamil father when she was ten years old.

Tearne attended the Ruskin School of Drawing and Fine Art, Oxford, (2000-2001) and earned an MA.

Career 
She was Leverhulme Artist in Residence at the Ashmolean Museum, Oxford in 2002–2003, then Artist in Residence at Modern Art Oxford in 2004. In October 2005 she started a three-year post-doctoral AHRC fellowship at Oxford Brookes University.

Art and film 
Tearne has exhibited at the Royal Academy of Arts, London. In a 1998 review of her work in Modern Painter, J.B. Bullen described Tearne's work as, "light is simultaneously everywhere and nowhere in these powerful paintings."

Tearne directed and shot five short films, including, Letter from Urbino, which was screened at the National Gallery, London, in 2012 as part of the launch of her novel The Road to Urbino.

Writing 
Tearne's first novel, Mosquito, published by HarperCollins in 2007, was shortlisted for the Costa Prize and nominated for the Los Angeles Times Book Prize. Her second novel, Bone China, was published in spring 2008. Her third novel, Brixton Beach, was published in 2009. Her fourth novel, The Swimmer, (May 2010) was long-listed for the Orange Prize, while a film based on the narrative was made by Tearne and shown at the Venice Biennale in 2011. Her fifth novel, The Road to Urbino (2012) was long-listed for the Asian Man Booker, while another film by Tearne, based on the novel, was shown at the National Gallery, London, in June of that year. Tearne's most recent novels, The Last Pier (2015) and The White City (2017), were published by Aardrark Bureau.

Publications

Novels 

 2017 The White City. Aardvark Bureau 
 2015 The Last Pier. Aardvark Bureau 
 2012 The Road To Urbino, Little Brown 
 2010 The Swimmer, HarperCollins , long-listed for Orange Prize 2011
 2009 Brixton Beach, HarperCollins  
 French translation of Brixton Beach launched at St. Malo Festival (2011), shortlisted for a French readers' prize
 2008 Bone China, HarperCollins 
 2007 Mosquito, HarperCollins , shortlisted for Costa First Novel Award and nominated for Los Angeles Times Book Prize

Articles 

 2015 "Ariadne’s Thread: In memory of W.G. Sebald by Philippa Comber, book review: How Sebald remains a great inspiration for writer, Roma Tearne," The Independent
 2012 "The Essay: In Search of the Art of Enchantment", The Independent
 2010 "Sri Lanka’s Writers Must Remember and Speak Out", The Independent
 2008 "October 8 1950...", The Guardian
 2007 "In search of the Unseen Venice", The Times
 2007 (March) Chasing Venus, for Museum of the History of Science, Oxford
 2004 Field Study – 2, (London College of Communication) in conjunction with Tate Modern
 2004 "My Shadow Collection", Nel Corpo delle Città (Gangemaini, Rome), pp. 19-43
 2003 "Happenings in a Museum" (Ashmole Books) 23 pp.
 2002 "The House of Small Things" (Angel Row, Nottingham) 10 pp.
 2002 "House of Small Things", Source (Winter), pp. 26–33

FIlms 
2012 (June) Letter From Urbino (film) for The National Gallery, London
2011 (June) Venice Biennale Film, The Swimmer, at the Armenian Pavilion, in association with Oxford Brookes University
 2008 (November) Watermuseum, film for Nottingham Castle Museum

Selected exhibitions
2022 Royal Academy of Arts, Summer Exhibition
2019 Royal Academy of Arts, Summer Exhibition
2009  198 Gallery, one person show
2008 "Watermuseum", Nottingham Castle Museum, based on work during AHRC fellowship at Oxford Brookes University
2007 (August) Flashline: Royal Museum of Scotland, Edinburgh, as part of the Edinburgh Art Festival
2007 (March) "Crossing the Water": Modern Art, Oxford
2007 Blindfolding of the Sheldonian Emperor Statues
2006 Every Object Tells a Story. The South Asian gallery, V & A
2005 (February) Artist in Residence, Modern Art, Oxford
2004 Museo Laboratorio di Arte Contemporaneo, "La Sapienza", Rome. Blindfolding of statues around the city, including Giordano Bruno
2004 Installation at Modern Art, Oxford
2003 Light installations St Mary’s University Church, Oxford
2002 Ruskin MA degree show: London: Cubit gallery
2002 Bracknell Manor House: "Traces". New work as part of prize-winning entry for "Open Shutter"
2002 "The House of Small Things": Southern Arts and London Arts Board touring exhibition: Angel Row, Nottingham; X-Change Gallery, Oxford; 198 Gallery, London, Bracknell Gallery, Berkshire.
2002 Fotonetsouth: Bracknell Gallery Photographic show: First Prize
2001 "Sounding the Heart", one-person show, Milton Keynes General Hospital, National Health Service Trust
1997 Bankside Gallery, London, Royal Watercolour Society
1997 Sphinx Gallery, St James's, London
1997 Royal Academy of Arts, London
1997 Cadogan Gallery, London
1992 Ikon Gallery, Birmingham, South Asian Arts Festival
1991 Bankside Gallery, London. Mixed show
1991 Royal Society of Painters and Etchers, London
1990 Walker Art Gallery, Liverpool/Oxford Gallery. Mixed show
1990 Royal Society of Painters and Etchers, London
1991 Royal Academy of Arts, London
1990 Royal Academy of Arts, London
1989 Royal Academy of Arts, London

Public events 
2013 BBC Radio Open Book
2013 BBC Radio Woman’s Hour
2012 BBC Radio 3 The Essay
2012 BBC Radio Front Row
2009 BBC Radio Woman's Hour
2008 (June) Art and Neuroscience. A series of talks at Oxford University

References

External links
Profile on Guardian Unlimited
Tearne website
British Council 
Author website

1954 births
Living people
Sri Lankan emigrants to the United Kingdom
Academics of Oxford Brookes University
Alumni of the Ruskin School of Art
21st-century British women writers
British women novelists
21st-century British novelists
20th-century Sri Lankan writers
20th-century Sri Lankan women writers
21st-century Sri Lankan writers
21st-century Sri Lankan women writers